Rahim Khan is an Indian Politician who is the current Member of the Karnataka Legislative Assembly from the Bidar North constituency.  He was the Minister of State for Youth Empowerment and Sports of Karnataka from 22 December 2018 to 8 July 2019.

Constituency
He represents the Bidar (Karnataka) constituency.

Political Party
He is from the Indian National Congress.

References 

People from Yadgir district
Living people
Indian National Congress politicians from Karnataka
1967 births
Karnataka MLAs 2008–2013
Karnataka MLAs 2018–2023